The 2016–17 season is FC Sheriff Tiraspol's 20th season, and their 19th in the Divizia Naţională, the top-flight of Moldovan football.

Season Events
Bruno Irles was appointed as the club's new manager on 20 June 2016. On 23 September 2016, Bruno Irles' contract was terminated by mutual consent, with Roberto Bordin being appointed the club's new manager on 4 October 2016.

Squad

Out on loan

Transfers

In

Out

Loans in

Loans out

Released

Competitions

Moldovan Super Cup

Divizia Națională

Results summary

Results

League table

Golden Match

Moldovan Cup

Final

UEFA Champions League

Qualifying rounds

Squad statistics

Appearances and goals

|-
|colspan="14"|Players away on loan :
|-
|colspan="14"|Players who left Sheriff Tiraspol during the season:

|}

Goal scorers

Disciplinary record

References

External links 
 

FC Sheriff Tiraspol seasons
Moldovan football clubs 2016–17 season